Tullymurry railway station was on the Belfast and County Down Railway which ran from Belfast to Newcastle, County Down in Northern Ireland.

History

The station was opened by the Belfast and County Down Railway on 7 August 1871.

In 1896 it was relocated around 500 metres to the south west.

Before the opening of Ballykinlar Halt in 1914, the station was the main transport link for Ballykinlar Camp.

The station closed to passengers in 1950, by which time it had been taken over by the Ulster Transport Authority.

References 

 
 
 

Disused railway stations in County Down
Railway stations opened in 1871
Railway stations closed in 1950
1871 establishments in Ireland
1950 disestablishments in Northern Ireland
Railway stations in Northern Ireland opened in the 19th century